Bourse may refer to:
Exchange (organized market) or bourse
Stock exchange or bourse

Exchanges
Bourse de Bruxelles or Brussels Stock Exchange, Belgium
Bourse de Montreal, Canada
Paris Bourse, a historical stock exchange in France
Deutsche Bourse or Deutsche Börse, a stock exchange in Frankfurt am Main, Germany
Bharat Diamond Bourse, a diamond exchange in Mumbai, India
Borsa Italiana, a stock exchange in Milan, Italy
Bourse de Luxembourg
Bourse de Casablanca, Morocco
Bourse (Gothenburg), a former mercantile exchange in Sweden
Bourse de Tunis, Tunisia
Philadelphia Bourse, a former stock exchange in Pennsylvania, US
Bourse des Valeurs d'Abidjan, a former stock exchange in the francophone West African countries

Other uses
Bourse (Paris Métro), a metro station
Bourse de Travail, a French labor council
 La Bourse, a short story by Honoré de Balzac
Bourse (IIeme arrondissement of Paris, administrative district of paris

See also 
 Börse (disambiguation)